Daragh may refer to:
 Dair, an Ogham letter
 Daragh, Iran, a village